Andersen Corporation is an international window and door manufacturing enterprise employing 12,000 people at more than thirty manufacturing facilities, logistics centers, and company owned retail locations. Andersen is a private company headquartered in Bayport, Minnesota.

Andersen ranked #146 on Forbes List of America's Largest Private Companies, with $3 billion in annual sales for fiscal year ending December 31, 2021, and #185 on Forbes list of America's best large employers in 2022. Andersen Corporation and its affiliates make up the largest window and door manufacturer in North America.

Andersen Corporation and its subsidiaries manufacture and market window and door products under the names Andersen, Renewal by Andersen, MQ, and Heritage. Andersen has manufacturing facilities in the United States, Canada, and Italy. Andersen's production facility in Bayport, Minnesota, comprises a 2.8-million-square-feet area spread over 65 acres.

History
Andersen Corporation was founded in 1903 as the Andersen Lumber Company by Danish immigrant Hans Jacob Andersen and his family at Hudson, Wisconsin. In 1929, the name of the firm was changed to Andersen Frame Company, and again in 1937 to Andersen Corporation. 

Andersen Lumber Company was originally based in Hudson, Wisconsin, where logs arrived at their location via the St. Croix River. In 1908, Hans Andersen sold the lumberyards to devote all the company's efforts to the window frame business. Needing room for expansion, Andersen built a factory in 1913 in South Stillwater (now Bayport, Minnesota). In 1914, Fred C. Andersen became president. In 1916, Andersen resumed operating the lumber business.

When metals were scarce during World War II, Andersen began producing windows using parts less metal and other material to support the war effort. Andersen Corporation also made wooden ammunition boxes for the war effort, which resulted in "Excellence in Production" ("E") awards from the United States Army, and United States Navy.

Recent History

Renewal by Andersen was founded in 1995 and in 2015 opened a 125,000 square-foot manufacturing plant expansion. Andersen opened a new manufacturing facility in Menomonie, Wisconsin in 2000. 

Andersen announced an $18 million expansion of its Bayport operations in April 2015. 

In 2015, Andersen added more than 300 jobs as part of a $45 million expansion project at its Renewal manufacturing facility in Cottage Grove and its Fibrex extrusion plant in North Branch. 

In October, 2017, Andersen acquired Quebec-based Fenêtres MQ Inc., a Quebec-based manufacturer of high-end doors and windows. 

In January 2018, Andersen acquired Frontier Tooling and Design Corp, an extrusion tooling supplier in Huntington, West Virginia. In March 2018, Andersen acquired Heritage Windows and Doors, a manufacturer of custom aluminum doors and windows in Gilbert, Arizona.

Philanthropy
The Bayport Foundation, the precursor to the Andersen Corporate Foundation, was established in 1941. The first check cut was a $100 gift to Carleton College in Northfield, Minn. As of April 2012, the foundation has donated more than $50 million to a wide range of nonprofit organizations that provide community, social and support services to improve people's lives and strengthen communities. 

A Boy Scouts of America camp located on the St. Croix River and operated by Northern Star Council was named after former Andersen president Fred C. Andersen.

References

External links
Andersen Corporation
An extensive collection of historical Andersen Corporation Records is available for research use at the Minnesota Historical Society.

Manufacturing companies based in Minnesota
Manufacturing companies established in 1903
1903 establishments in Wisconsin
Privately held companies based in Minnesota
Window manufacturers
Building materials companies of the United States
American brands
Washington County, Minnesota